Burkle, Bürkle or Buerkle  (English: /ˈbɜːrkəl/ BUR-kəl) is a German surname that may refer to
Ann Marie Buerkle (born 1951), American nurse, attorney, and politician 
Dick Buerkle (born 1947), American runner 
Frederick M. "Skip" Burkle Jr. (born 1940) is an American physician and activist
Heinrich Bürkle de la Camp (1895–1974), German army doctor
Ronald Burkle (born 1952), American investor and philanthropist 
Winifred Burkle, fictional character on the American TV series Angel
Yul Bürkle (born 1974), Venezuelan actor and model

German-language surnames